Elections to Liverpool Town Council were held on Thursday 1 November 1849. One third of the council seats were up for election, the term of office of each councillor being three years.

Eight of the sixteen wards were uncontested.

The major issues were the Rivington Pike Water Scheme and the imposition of rates on the dock and corporation estates. In several wards Candidates with the same party affiliation stood for election against each other over these issues

After the election, the composition of the council was:

Election result

Of the sixteen councillors elected, fourteen were opposed to the Rivington Pike water scheme and two were in favour.

Ward results

* - Retiring Councillor seeking re-election

Abercromby

Bernard Hall was opposed to the Rivington Pike water scheme and in favour of imposing rates on the docks and corporation estate.

Castle Street

Thomas Avison was opposed to the Rivington Pike water scheme, whereas James Aikin was in favour.

Everton

Thomas Chalmer was opposed to the Rivington Pike water scheme.

Exchange

James Tyrer was in favour of the Rivington Pike water scheme and opposed to imposing rates on the docks and corporation estate.

Great George

John Rogers was opposed to the Rivington Pike water scheme and in favour of imposing rates on the docks and corporation estate.

Lime Street

James Allanson Picton was opposed to the Rivington Pike water scheme.

North Toxteth

Thomas Lloyd was opposed to the Rivington Pike water scheme.

Pitt Street

Thomas Toulmin was opposed to the Rivington Pike water scheme.

Rodney Street

Samuel Holmes was in favour of the Rivington Pike water scheme, 
which Algernon Frederick Jones opposed.

St. Anne Street

William Bennett was opposed to the Rivington Pike water scheme.

St. Paul's

Thomas Godfrey was opposed to the Rivington Pike water scheme and in favour of imposing rates on the dock and council estates, as was Dr. John Games.

St. Peter's

John Charles Fernihough and Thomas Clarke were both opposed to the Rivington Pike water scheme.

Scotland

John Bingham was opposed to the Rivington Pike water scheme, but James Holme was in favour.

There were two cases of Personation. John Jones of Cazneau-street, 
who intended to vote for Mr. Bingham, discovered that he had been personated by someone who had voted for James Holme.
David Starke of Waterloo-road discovered that someone else had voted for Mr. Bingham in his name.

John Holmes of Dryden-street, gave in his voting paper for Mr. Bingham, but as he walked away before his name was recorded, his vote was lost.

Liverpool Mail Saturday 3 November 1849

South Toxteth

William Joseph Horsfall was in favour of the Rivington Pike water scheme, whereas Richard Harbord was opposed.

Vauxhall

Jonathan Atkinson was opposed to the Rivington Pike water scheme, whereas William Rathbone V was in favour.

West Derby

Arthur Henderson was opposed to the Rivington Pike water scheme, Daniel Mather
was a supporter of collecting rates from the dock and council estates.

At about half past two the chairman of Mr. Mather's committee proposed to the chairman of Mr. Henderson's committee that Mr. Mather withdrew from the contest and that "all double votes be sent down to Castle-street ward in favour of Mr. Avison". This was agreed.

Aldermanic By Election 29 October 1850

At a meeting of the Council on Tuesday 29 October 1850 Cllr. James Parker (Conservative, St. Anne Street, elected 1 November 1847) was elected as an Alderman to take the place of Alderman William Nicol (elected as an Alderman on Tuesday 9 November 1847), who had resigned. As Cllr. Parker's term of office as a Councillor was due to expire on 1 November 1850, there was no need to hold a by election to fill this post, as it would be filled at the municipal elections on 1 November 1850.

See also
Liverpool Town Council elections 1835 - 1879
Liverpool City Council elections 1880–present
Mayors and Lord Mayors of Liverpool 1207 to present
History of local government in England

References

1849
1849 English local elections
November 1849 events
1840s in Liverpool